MRLS may refer to:

 Mare reproductive loss syndrome, an ailment in horse
 Mountain Regional Library System, a public library system in Georgia, U.S.

See also
 MRL (disambiguation)
 MLRS, multiple launch rocket system